Genoese, locally called  or  , is the prestige dialect of Ligurian, spoken in and around the Italian city of Genoa, the capital of Liguria, in Northern Italy.

A majority of remaining speakers of Genoese are elderly.

Written literature has been produced in Genoese since the 13th century, and the orthography has evolved in-step with the language. There are currently two  spelling systems in common use, with varying degrees of standardisation. One, proposed in 2008 by the cultural association A Compagna, attempts to closely match in writing the pronunciation of the now-extinct variant of Genoese which used to be spoken in the Portoria neighbourhood of Genoa. Another spelling system was proposed by a group of writers, journalists and academics by standardising the traditional orthography of 19th- and 20th-century Genoese newspapers. This is the spelling used, amongst others, by the academic world as well as by Il Secolo XIX, the largest print newspaper in the region.

Genoese has had an influence on the Llanito vernacular of Gibraltar.

Phonology
Genoese phonology includes a number of similarities with French, one being the heavily nasalized vowels before nasal consonants (in VN(C) sequences), also occurring when Genoese speakers speak standard Italian. There used to be an alveolar approximant (English-like)  opposed to an alveolar trill  (using the 18th century spelling:   "dear" vs.   "cart"), but it is no longer heard in the city. It may still survive in some rural areas of Liguria, such as Calizzano and Sassello. By far the most widespread type of  today is the alveolar tap  (very similar, or identical, to unstressed Standard Italian ). There are several distinctive local accents of Genoese: those of Nervi, Quinto and Quarto to the east of Genoa, Voltri, Prà, Pegli and Sestri to the west. There are also accents of the central Polcevera Valley and Bisagno.

Genoese has eight vowels, twenty consonants, and three semivowels.

Vowels

 as in barba  ("uncle"; "beard")
 as in tésta  ("head")
 as in ægoa  ("water")
 as in bibin  ("turkey")
 as in cöse  ("what?")
 as in anchêu  ("today")
 as in comme  ("how?")
 as in fugassa  (focaccia, a kind of Italian bread)

Orthography 

 ^ is a circumflex accent placed above a vowel and doubles its length.
 ao is read as the Italian “au” or the genovese “ou” or a long Italian “o”.
 è is read as a brief open e. The symbol æ, made up of vowels a ed e, is read as an open long "e"; in groups ænn-a and æn it is read as an open short “e”.
 e and é are read as a closed short “e”; ê is read as a long closed “e”.
 eu is read as if it were read in French: in eu and éu the sound is short in êu the sound is long.
 j is used infrequently and indicates that i should be heard in words such as: gjêmo (giriamo), mangjâ (mangerà), cacjæ (getterei), lascjâ (lascerà), socjêtæ (società).
 o, ó and ô are read as an Italian u like in the word muso; the length of ô is double the length of o and ó.
 ò and ö are read as o in Italian like in the word cosa; the length of ö is double ò.
 u is read as a French u with the exception in groups qu, òu and ou where the u is read as the u in the Italian word guida.
 ç always has a voiceless sound like s in the Italian word sacco. 
 Word-final n and groups nn- , n- (written with a hyphen) indicate a velar n (such as the n in the Italian word vengo) and are therefore pronounced nasally. The same goes for when n precedes a consonant (including b and p).
 s followed by a vowel, s followed by a voiceless consonant, and s between vowels is always a voiceless , sound like the s in the Italian word sacco. s followed by a voiced consonant becomes voiced , as in Italian.
 scc is pronounced , like sc of the Italian word scena followed sonorously by c of the Italian word cilindro.
 x is read  like the French j (e.g. jambon, jeton, joli).
 z, even when it is doubled as zz, is always pronounced  as the s in the Italian word rosa.

Tongue twisters 
  = I don't have a clue whether the salt is going to be enough to salt the sausage.
 = Ski, madam, skying you fly on skis.
 = At the new pier there are nine new ships; the newest of the nine new ships doesn't want to go.
 = Do angels have eyes, ears, and (finger)nails like everyone else? (variant of the Cogorno comune)

Expressions
 = "I'm Genoese, I seldom laugh, I grind my teeth, and I say what I mean" (literally, "speak clearly").
 The child complains:  = I'm hungry. The mother answers:  = Scratch your knees and make lasagna.
  = "If you want to live as a good Christian, stay away from those who pretend to be devout" (a traditional warning to beware of fanatics and hypocrites).
  = You can't have or do two contradicting things at the same time (literally, "you can't inhale and exhale").
  = Wow! or Damn! (very informal) (literally the word means "penis", but it lost its obscene meaning and is currently used as an intensifier in a lot of different expressions, acting almost as an equivalent of the English "Fuck!" or "Fuck it!").

Songs 
One of the most famous folk songs written in the Genoese dialect is called  (or ) written by Mario Cappello.

Towards the end of the 20th century, artist Fabrizio De André wrote an entire album called  in the Genoese dialect.

References

External links

Genoese phonology 
List of resources for learning Genoese 
 
 Audio samples of many Italian dialects.
 Official website of the Academia Ligustica do Brenno.

A Compagna 
Genoves.com.ar – Bilingual website in Spanish and Genoese, with resources to learn Genoese, Ligurian literature with Spanish version, texts, photos, etc. 

Ligurian language (Romance)
Dialect
City colloquials

it:Dialetto genovese